John Rogers McBride (August 22, 1832 – July 20, 1904) was an American lawyer and politician who served one term as a Republican U.S. congressman from Oregon from 1863 to 1865.

Early life
McBride was born near St. Louis, Missouri in 1832, the son of James McBride. In 1851, he moved with his family to Lafayette, Oregon, where he became the superintendent of schools at the age of 22. He studied law and after being admitted to the bar in 1855, he began a law practice in Lafayette.

Oregon politics
In 1857, he served in the Oregon Constitutional Convention representing Yamhill County. In 1860, he was elected to the Oregon Senate, and to the United States House of Representatives as a Republican in 1862. He served one term, and after unsuccessfully seeking the Republican party's nomination for a second term in 1864, he was appointed Chief Justice of Idaho Territory by President Lincoln.

In 1869, President Grant named him superintendent of the United States assay office in Boise, Idaho. He was a member of Republican National Committee from the Idaho Territory in 1872, and a member of Republican National Committee from Washington from 1880 to 1892. He practiced law in Boise and in Salt Lake City, Utah before moving his practice to Spokane, Washington, where he died in 1904. He was interred at Germany Hill Cemetery in St. Helens, Oregon.

Family
McBride's youngest brother, George W. McBride, served as a United States senator from Oregon. His other younger brother Thomas A. McBride was the chief justice of the Oregon Supreme Court three times.

References

External links

Biographical Sketch of John McBride at Crafting the Oregon Constitution, Oregon State Archives

1832 births
1904 deaths
Republican Party Oregon state senators
Politicians from St. Louis
People from Lafayette, Oregon
People from St. Helens, Oregon
Republican Party members of the United States House of Representatives from Oregon
19th-century American politicians
Members of the Oregon Constitutional Convention